The Bogdan Petriceicu Hasdeu State University is a public university in Cahul, Moldova, founded in 1999. It was named in honor of the Romanian writer and philologist Bogdan Petriceicu Hasdeu.

Structure

Faculties
 Faculty of Law and Public Administration
 Faculty of Economy, Computer Science and Mathematics
 Faculty of Philology and History

Partnership agreement
 Cross–border Faculty of Humanities, Economic and Engineering Sciences, in collaboration with University of Galați - Romania

See also
 List of universities in Moldova
 Education in Moldova

References

External links

 Official site
 Cross–border Faculty Official site

Educational institutions established in 1999
University
Universities in Moldova
1999 establishments in Moldova